Marek Władysław Papała (September 4, 1959 – June 25, 1998) was a Polish police officer and Chief of Police from January 3, 1997, to January 29, 1998, who died as a result of a gunshot head wound from a silenced TT pistol on June 25, 1998. Officially, Papała died at the hands of a car thief turned state witness Igor L. Due to numerous inaccuracies the investigation was criticized by many former police officers and journalists.

The Papała contract killing is widely regarded as the most serious unsolved crime involving former communist security services SB, high-ranking members of the government, and the mafia, since Poland's transition to democracy in 1989.

See also
List of unsolved murders

References

External links
Europe Former Polish police chief shot, BBC News Europe, Friday, June 26, 1998
Ex-Polish Police Chief Is Found Shot Dead, New York Times, June 27, 1998

1959 births
1998 deaths
1998 murders in Poland
Deaths by firearm in Poland
Male murder victims
Polish police officers
People murdered in Poland
Unsolved murders in Poland